Progress M-6 was a Soviet uncrewed cargo spacecraft which was launched in 1991 to resupply the Mir space station. The twenty-fourth of sixty four Progress spacecraft to visit Mir, it used the Progress-M 11F615A55 configuration, and had the serial number 205. It carried supplies including food, water and oxygen for the EO-8 crew aboard Mir, as well as equipment for conducting scientific research, and fuel for adjusting the station's orbit and performing manoeuvres.

Progress M-6 was launched at 14:50:27 GMT on 14 January 1991, on a Soyuz-U2 carrier rocket flying from Site 1/5 at the Baikonur Cosmodrome. Following two days of free flight, it docked with the aft port of the Kvant-1 module of Mir at 16:35:25 GMT on 16 January.

Progress M-6 undocked from Mir at 12:46:41 GMT on 15 March, and was deorbited a few hours later at 17:14:00. It burned up in the atmosphere over the Pacific Ocean at around 18:07:26.

See also

1991 in spaceflight
List of Progress flights
List of uncrewed spaceflights to Mir

References

Spacecraft launched in 1991
1991 in the Soviet Union
Progress (spacecraft) missions